Djémil Kessous (born in 1946) is a retired civil servant who worked for the French Council of State, and a writer of social, and philosophical works He is a son of the Algerian politician Mohamed El Aziz Kessous.

Biography

He has published in French the books La théorie générale de l'évolution (L'Harmattan) and L'Universalisme (Acratie, 1997). The latter work was translated into Esperanto by Jacqueline Lépeix under the title "La Universalismo, Sennacieca Asocio Tutmonda, 2002)".

Selected bibliography

 La théorie générale de l'évolution - Le principe néguentropique, L'Harmattan, 1994 
 L'Universalisme, Acratie, 1997 
 La Universalismo, Sennacieca Asocio Tutmonda, 2002

References

External links
 La modernisation et après ? - article by Djémil Kessous on Bella Ciao
 Une solution laïque pour la question palestinienne - article by Lucien Bresler, Djémil Kessous, Gary Mickle
  In Esperanto of the Syrian civil war
   In French Was Albert Camus racist ? (Le Quotidien d'Oran)

1946 births
Living people
French civil servants
French editors
Social philosophers
Continental philosophers
20th-century French philosophers
French male non-fiction writers